Alexander McKinnon (3 March 1878 – c. 1944) was a rugby union player who represented Australia.

McKinnon, a lock, was born in Smeaton, Victoria and claimed one international rugby cap for Australia, playing against Great Britain, at Brisbane, on 23 July 1904.

References

Australian rugby union players
Australia international rugby union players
1878 births
Year of death missing
Rugby union players from Victoria (Australia)
Rugby union locks